Stroud Glacier is west of the Continental Divide in the northern Wind River Range in the U.S. state of Wyoming. The glacier is located in the Bridger Wilderness of Bridger-Teton National Forest, and is among the largest grouping of glaciers in the American Rocky Mountains. The glacier is situated in a north facing cirque, below the summit of Bow Mountain.

References

See also
 List of glaciers in the United States

Glaciers of Sublette County, Wyoming
Glaciers of Wyoming